Nonthaburi Futsal Club (Thai สโมสรฟุตซอลนนทบุรี) is a Thai Futsal club which currently plays in the Thailand Futsal League.

Players

Current squad

External links 
 Nonthaburi Futsal Club

Futsal clubs in Thailand
Futsal clubs established in 2006
2006 establishments in Thailand